Balkan cuisine is a type of regional cuisine that combines characteristics of European cuisine with some of those from Western Asia. It is found in the Balkan Peninsula of Southeast Europe, a region without clear boundaries but which is generally considered to at least include the modern countries of Albania, Bulgaria, Romania and Greece and the former Yugoslavia, with the possible exception of Slovenia and northern inland regions of Croatia.

Balkan cuisine can be found in Vienna as a result of post-WWII migration to that city. Germany has restaurants serving Balkan cuisine, which were often called Yugoslavian restaurants until the outbreak of the Yugoslav Wars. There were Balkan Grills in West Germany from the 1960s, leading to the popularisation of ćevapčići in Germany, but these establishments have become rarer since the late 1980s and those that survive are often now called "Croatian" instead. A restaurant selling Romani cuisine opened in Slovenia in 2014. Romani cuisine, the traditional food of the Romani people, includes dishes from traditional Balkan cuisine.

History

The Balkans have a history of foreign rule and internal power struggles, and this has resulted in a diverse cuisine in which influences have merged as a result of cultural exchange. The historical foundation of modern Balkan cuisine is Ottoman cuisine, which itself was heavily influenced by Arabian Levantine cuisine and the medieval Byzantine cuisine. The Ottoman Empire introduced the use of peppers to the region and it also brought börek, a filo pastry with origins that may lie in Ancient Roman cuisine. During the Ottoman presence, dishes such as ćevapi and pljeskavica were introduced along with Turkish coffee. At the same time pork became popular in northern Serbia as pigs were not taxed under Ottoman Islamic law. 

The components of Balkan cuisine are also typically drawn from the traditional cuisines of Greece, Persia, the Arab countries and Turkey, as well as the Balkan region itself, and there has been some borrowing from Mediterranean cuisine, Armenian cuisine and the cuisines of North West Africa and Central Europe. Commonalities can be found with German cuisine, Hungarian cuisine and Slavic cuisine. The involvement of Austria, Hungary and Italy in the Balkans led to the introduction of breaded-meat dishes and goulash, as well as an emphasis on seafood. The influence of Persian cuisine is shown by the use of yoghurt in meat dishes. There are also some contributions from Jewish cuisine, such as patišpanja, the sponge cake found in Bosnia and Herzegovina.

Characteristics
Balkan cuisine is characterised by very diverse, strong and spicy food. Pickled vegetables and small hot peppers are common ingredients, with peppers appearing in ajvar spread. Feta cheese is also a popular ingredient. Dishes frequently make use of stuffed vegetables such as sarma which is made with stuffed vine leaves. Also popular is moussaka, a dish made with eggplants or potatoes. Many dishes are served with the thick cream known as kajmak and the egg-and-lemon sauce avgolemono is also widely used. Meze are often served as appetizers, as they are in Levantine cuisine and Caucasian cuisine. Popular desserts include baklava and halva and the fruit brandy rakia is often drunk. Cooking is typically done using a sač, a type of baking lid covered with hot coals or ashes, a technique dating back to Ancient Greek cuisine.

Diversity
The similarities within Balkan cuisine are partly due to the common natural environment of the Balkans which provides similar food ingredients. Many dishes and recipes across the Balkan region are referred to using the same vocabulary, albeit with national variations. The common features of Balkan cuisine are most easily seen in the haute cuisine of restaurants. In contrast, meals prepared domestically reveal the cuisine's geographic variation, including a series of intermediate cuisines ranging from those of North and Mediterranean Europe to that of the Middle East. The different nationalities within the Balkans create their own variations, and a dish by the same name may have different ingredients and preparation methods in different countries. Chocolate, cakes and sweet confections are popular in the North Balkans, but in the South it is seafood, honeyed sweets and pastas that indicate the area's more Mediterranean style.

See also

  Albanian cuisine
 Cham cuisine
  Aromanian cuisine
  Bulgarian cuisine
  Cypriot cuisine
  Greek cuisine
 Cretan cuisine
 Epirotic cuisine
   Macedonian cuisine
 Heptanesean cuisine
  Moldovan cuisine
  Romani cuisine
  Romanian cuisine
  Turkish cuisine
  Yugoslav cuisines:
  Bosnian-Herzegovinian cuisine
  Croatian cuisine
  Macedonian cuisine
  Montenegrin cuisine
  Serbian cuisine
  Kosovan cuisine
  Slovenian cuisine

References

 
Cuisine by region
Mediterranean cuisine